Low arousal most likely refers to when a person is in a state of low arousal.

It can also refer to:
Low arousal approach, deals with how staff handles patients who are easily provoked
Low arousal theory, explains that individuals who have antisocial personality disorder or ADHD seek excessive activity to combat a state of low arousal
Various forms of Sexual dysfunction